Manfred Höppner (born 16 April 1934 in Weinböhla, Germany) served as the German Democratic Republic's (GDR) top sports doctor.  He and Manfred Ewald, the GDR's minister of sport (1961–1988) and president of the country's Olympic committee from 1973 to 1990, are considered the architects of the GDR's state-sponsored system of the illicit use of performance-enhancing drugs, believed to account for the GDR's Olympic successes between 1972–1988. Höppner allegedly had ties to the East German secret police, the Stasi.

Doping scandal
On July 18, 2000, in Berlin, Höppner and Ewald were convicted as accessories to the intentional bodily harm of athletes, including minors. Both received probation. During the trial, Höppner testified that they had received approval from the highest levels of government. However, unlike his colleague, Höppner expressed remorse in his role and told the court, "I beg those athletes who suffered ill health to accept my apologies."

References

External links
Entry at Britannica Online Encyclopedia (requires subscription)

1934 births
Living people
People from Meissen (district)
Socialist Unity Party of Germany members
East German physicians
German sports physicians
People of the Stasi
Recipients of the National Prize of East Germany
Sportspeople from Saxony